Viviennea ardesiaca is a moth in the family Erebidae first described by Walter Rothschild in 1909. It is found in Costa Rica and Venezuela.

References

Phaegopterina
Moths described in 1909